The Well is a 2015 Algerian drama film directed by Lotfi Bouchouchi. It was selected as the Algerian entry for the Best Foreign Language Film at the 89th Academy Awards but it was not nominated.

Cast
 Nadia Kaci as Freyha
 Laurent Maurel as Lieutenant Encinas
 Layla Metssitane as Khadidja
 Ourais Achour as Cheikh Benaouda

See also
 List of submissions to the 89th Academy Awards for Best Foreign Language Film
 List of Algerian submissions for the Academy Award for Best Foreign Language Film

References

External links
 

2015 films
2015 drama films
2010s French-language films
Algerian drama films